Rodney or Rod Wallace may refer to:

Rodney Wallace (politician) (1823–1903), U.S. Representative from Massachusetts
Rodney Wallace (fighter) (born 1981), American professional mixed martial arts fighter
Rodney Wallace (footballer) (born 1988), Costa Rican association footballer
Rodney Wallace (American football) (1949–2013), American football offensive lineman
Rod Wallace (born 1969), retired English footballer

See also
Wallace (surname)